La Tonya Johnson (born June 22, 1972) is an American activist and politician from Milwaukee, Wisconsin. She serves in the Wisconsin State Senate, representing the seat formerly held by Nikiya Harris Dodd, having easily defeated her opponents in the Fall 2016 primary election, and being unopposed in the general election.

Background 
Johnson was born June 22, 1972 in La Grange, Tennessee. She earned a B.S. degree in criminal justice from Tennessee State University, and has lived in Milwaukee for twenty-eight years. She owned and operated Anointed Child Care Service, an in-home daycare service, and served as president of Local 502 of AFSCME, the union which represents in-home daycare providers in Milwaukee County. She has one daughter, Sydney.

Nomination and election

Assembly 
When Barbara Toles resigned from her Assembly District 17 seat, Johnson was one of four candidates who vied for the Democratic nomination in this recently redistricted inner city district. She achieved an easy plurality, with 43% of the vote, in a field which included a former Milwaukee Area Technical College Board member with UAW ties, and an aide to State Representative Elizabeth Coggs.
 
In the general election, she drew 20,262 votes, to 3564 for her sole opponent, banker Anthony Edwards.

Senate 
In November 2016, Johnson was elected to the Wisconsin State Senate. She had easily defeated two opponents (local government lobbyist Thomas Harris and Milwaukee School Board member  Michael Bonds) in the August Democratic primary, and was unopposed in the general election. In 2020, she defeated primary challenger Michelle Bryant, the chief of staff for State Senator Lena Taylor. In the general election, she defeated Alciro Deacon in a landslide.

References

External links 

Profile at the Wisconsin Senate
Campaign website
Campaign website on Facebook
Interview with Johnson on WisconsinEYE

1972 births
African-American state legislators in Wisconsin
African-American women in politics
American trade union leaders
Living people
Democratic Party Wisconsin state senators
Democratic Party members of the Wisconsin State Assembly
People from La Grange, Tennessee
Politicians from Milwaukee
Tennessee State University alumni
Women state legislators in Wisconsin
21st-century American politicians
21st-century American women politicians
American Federation of State, County and Municipal Employees people
21st-century African-American women
21st-century African-American politicians
20th-century African-American people
20th-century African-American women